Breg is a settlement in the hills south of Mežica in the Carinthia region in northern Slovenia.

It was a typical miners' settlement associated with the nearby lead and zinc mine under Mount Peca. As such, the entire late-19th century miners' village has been declared a monument of national heritage by the Slovenian Ministry of Culture.

References

External links
Breg on Geopedia

Populated places in the Municipality of Mežica